Rhodri Williams (born 5 May 1993) is a Wales international rugby union player. A scrum-half, he plays his club rugby for the Dragons, having previously played for Scarlets.

Club career

Williams came through the academy system at Pro12 side Scarlets and, after starting his career at Llandovery RFC in the Welsh Premier Division, he made his senior Scarlets debut in 2011.

Although a popular player at the Scarlets, Williams would struggle for starts ahead of scrum-half rivals Gareth Davies and Aled Davies, both players also being ahead of Williams in the Wales pecking order. 

It was announced on 1 February 2016 that Williams had signed for Bristol for the 2016–17 season. Although Bristol were relegated from the English Rugby Premiership at the end of his first season at the club, Williams remained at the club and was a key part of the side's successful campaign to be promoted again in the subsequent season. 

In December 2017, however, Williams signed for the Dragons ahead of the upcoming 2018–19 season, specifically citing his desire to push for more Wales honours. Since joining the Dragons, he has been an influential figure, captaining the side on numerous occasions.

International career 
In January 2013, he was selected in the Wales squad for the 2013 Six Nations Under 20s Championship. Later that year was part of the Wales U20 side which reached the 2013 IRB Junior World Championship Final, which the Welsh team lost 15–23 against England.

On 22 November 2013, he made his full international debut versus Tonga as a second-half replacement. He was then named in the Wales squad for the 2014 Six Nations Championship and scored his first international try against Scotland in what was (as of 2022) his last game for Wales.

On 27 May 2018 he played for the Barbarians against England at Twickenham. He appeared for the Barbarians again in 2019, coming off the bench to score a try as they lost to England 51–43.

Williams earned a recall to the national side in June 2021, when he was selected in the squad for the 2021 July rugby union tests. However, he would not appear in the games against Canada and Argentina due to a shoulder injury.

Williams was again called up by Wales in 2022, following injuries in the squad. He was not selected in a match day squad and ultimately did not appear.

International tries

Personal life

Williams is a fluent Welsh speaker.

References

External links
 Scarlets profile
 Dragons profile

Wales international rugby union players
Scarlets players
Dragons RFC players
1993 births
Living people
Rugby union players from Swansea
Welsh rugby union players
Bristol Bears players
Rugby union scrum-halves